Balbi's Arch, in Rovinj, Croatia, was built in 1678–79. The arch leads to Grisia Street. On one side, there is the carved head of a Turk while on the other is the carved head of a Venetian. It stands on the site of the old town gate.

References 

Arches and vaults
Buildings and structures in Istria County